Allennes-les-Marais is a commune in the Nord department in northern France.

Population

Heraldry

International relations

Allennes-les-Marais is twinned with:
 Białobrzegi, Poland

See also
Communes of the Nord department

References

Communes of Nord (French department)
French Flanders